Buchanan County Infirmary, also known as Buchanan County Poor Farm and Green Acres, is a historic hospital building located in St. Joseph, Missouri, United States.  It was built in 1919, and is a two-story, "F"-shaped Classical Revival-style building with a "fireproof' concrete structure, brick walls, and a cross-hip roof clad with red ceramic tiles. It features a central porch with four full-height concrete Doric order columns that support a projecting, pedimented roof. It is the last surviving structure of the Buchanan County Poor Farm.

It was listed on the National Register of Historic Places in 2009.

References

Hospital buildings on the National Register of Historic Places in Missouri
Neoclassical architecture in Missouri
Government buildings completed in 1919
Buildings and structures in St. Joseph, Missouri
National Register of Historic Places in Buchanan County, Missouri